Juan Miguel Mercado Martínez (born 8 July 1978 in Armilla, Granada) is a Spanish professional road bicycle racer who turned professional with Vitalicio Seguros in 1998. At the Tour de France, Mercado won Stage 18 at the 2004 Tour and captured a surprise win on Stage 10 (the first mountain stage) of the 2006 Tour de France in an early breakaway with Cyril Dessel (Ag2r Prévoyance).

On 19 February 2020, media reports suggested that Mercado was a suspect in a police investigation into a "burglary gang" in the city of Granada.

Major results

1998 – Vitalicio Seguros
1999 – Vitalicio Seguros
2000 – Vitalicio Seguros
2001 – iBanesto.com
 Stage win – Vuelta a España
 Stage win – Volta ao Alentejo
 Overall and Stage win – Vuelta a Burgos
2002 – iBanesto.com
 Overall – Setmana Catalana de Ciclisme
 Overall and Stage win – Vuelta a Castilla y León
2003 – iBanesto.com
 Stage win – Dauphiné Libéré
2004 – Quick Step-Davitamon
 Stage 18 win – Tour de France
 Stage win – Giro del Trentino
2005 – Quick Step-Innergetic
 Overall and Stage win – Tour of Austria
2006 – Agritubel
 1st, Stage 10 – Tour de France

External links

References

1978 births
Living people
Spanish male cyclists
Spanish Tour de France stage winners
Spanish Vuelta a España stage winners
Sportspeople from the Province of Granada
Cyclists from Andalusia